"Intercrime" is the fifteenth episode of the second series of the 1960s cult British spy-fi television series The Avengers, starring Patrick Macnee and Honor Blackman. It was first broadcast by ABC on 6 January 1963. The episode was directed by Jonathan Alwyn and written by Terrance Dicks and Malcolm Hulke.

Plot
Cathy Gale takes on the identity of an assassin to infiltrate a criminal gang. However things get complicated when the real assassin escapes from prison.

Production notes
This episode was the first to be credited to John Bryce as producer. Later he re-worked it as "The Great, Great Britain Crime" for the sixth series. However after Bryce was replaced it was re-edited and released as "Homicide and Old Lace".

A brief continuity lapse causes a camera to be visible through a door in the last scenes of this episode.

Cast
 Patrick Macnee as John Steed
 Honor Blackman as Cathy Gale 
 Kenneth J. Warren as William Felder
 Julia Arnall as Hilda Stern 
 Angela Browne as Pamela Johnson
 Patrick Holt as Jack Manning
 Alan Browning as Moss 
 Jerome Willis as Lobb 
 Paul Hansard as Hans Kressler
 Donald Webster as Palmer
 Rory MacDermot as Sewell
 Bettine Milne as Prison Officer Sharpe
 Charlotte Selwyn as Trustie
 Jean Gregory as Trustie

References

External links

Episode overview on The Avengers Forever! website

The Avengers (season 2) episodes
1963 British television episodes